Kim Gyeong-jae (born 24 July 1993) is a South Korean footballer who plays for Jeju United.

References

External links

1993 births
Living people
South Korean footballers
K League 1 players
K League 2 players
Jeonnam Dragons players
Gimcheon Sangmu FC players
Jeju United FC players
Association football defenders